Ter or TER may refer to:

Places
 River Ter, in Essex, England
 Ter (river), in Catalonia
 Ter (department), a region in France
 Torre (river), (Slovene: Ter), a river in Italy
 Ter, Ljubno, a settlement in the Municipality of  Ljubno ob Savinji, Slovenia
 Ter, Maharashtra, India, a former city and archaeological site
 Lajes Field (IATA airport code TER), a multi-use airfield in Azores, Portugal

Other uses
 Ter Sami language
 Tertiary Entrance Rank, an Australian score
 Total expense ratio of investment fund
 Transport express régional, of the French rail network
 Teradyne (NYSE stock symbol)
 Ter (Armenian hereditary honorific)
 Trump Entertainment Resorts, a former gambling and hospitality company